Pouteria collina is a species of plant in the family Sapotaceae. It is found in Colombia and Ecuador.

References

collina
Vulnerable plants
Taxonomy articles created by Polbot